Deportations from East Prussia during World War I was a forced deportation of local inhabitants from Russian-occupied areas of East Prussia to remote areas of the Russian Empire in 1914–1915. The official rationale was to reduce espionage and other resistance behind the Russian front lines. As many as 13,600 people, including children and the elderly, were deported to Siberia. Due to difficult living conditions, the mortality rates were high and only 8,300 people returned home after the war. However, the deportations have received very little attention from scholars as they were overshadowed by the much larger refugee crisis in Russian Empire and the expulsion of Germans after World War II.

Background
Military action began on the Eastern Front on 17 August 1914 with the Battle of Stallupönen during the Russian invasion of East Prussia. It was the only German Empire territory, apart from Alsace-Lorraine on the Western Front, that saw direct military actions during the war. Russians were defeated in the Battle of Tannenberg and retreated, but counterattacked in October 1914. This time, they captured about one-fifth of Prussia. The front stabilized until February 1915 when Russians were driven out during the Second Battle of the Masurian Lakes. These two waves of Russian attacks were accompanied by two mass populations movements in different directions: locals evacuating deeper into Germany and deportations into Siberia. Contemporary estimates put the number of refugees into Germany at 870,000 in August and 300,000 in October. For comparison, the 1910 German census recorded a total population of 2,064,175 in East Prussia.

Russians deeply distrusted the German population. Even before battles began, MVD issued an order to treat every male citizen of the German Empire and Austria-Hungary between ages 18 and 45 as a civilian prisoners of war. To prevent espionage, such people had to be deported out of the European Russia. Such policies resulted in some 200,000 German deportees from Volhynia and Bessarabia. Generally, the internment of civilians of enemy nationality became a common practice among the warring states.

Deportations

In the occupied areas of East Prussia, Russians suspected civilians to be involved in resistance. The distrust was bolstered by cultural differences. For example, Germans owned and used bicycles that Russians associated with official or military business; Germans were also not accustomed to carrying passports or other identity papers. Local spies were used as scapegoats to justify military defeats. Additionally, the removal of adult males reduced the number of potential new recruits when the German army returned. The deportations started during the first Russian occupation, but were of smaller scale (at least 1,000 people) and targeted primarily men of military age. For example, out of 724 people deported from Königsberg area only 10 were not adult males. Deportations during the second occupation grew in number, and included many children, women, and the elderly. In total, the deported people included about 4,000 women and 2,500 children.

The people were herded on foot or transported using requisitioned wagons to train stations, mostly in Šiauliai but also in Vilnius, packed into cattle cars, and taken on weeks-long train journey into interior of Russia. The deportations were poorly organized and coordinated. Some Lutherans from Šiauliai area were deported as well when they were mistaken for Germans. The officials were confused whether to treat them as refugees, deportees, civilian internees, or prisoners of war. Their condition was deplorable: many did not have basic necessities (such as money, food, warmer clothing), did not speak Russian, did not have any papers, and the Russian government had no organized plans to provide food for the journey or housing at the destination. There was no care taken to deport families together and many were split up. Due to cold, lack of food and medical care, many deportees died on the journey or soon after. For example, Prussian Lithuanian activist Martynas Jankus was deported at the end of 1914 together with his entire family to Bugulma. In his memoirs, he recounted four deaths even before reaching the train. His 85-year-old father and 4-year-old son died at the destination by mid-January 1915. In total, out of 350 deportees to Bugulma, 52 died. Felicija Bortkevičienė, who visited various deportees communities in 1916, estimated mortality rates of 15–20%.

At the destination, living conditions and treatment of the deportees varied greatly. Some deportees were forced to work in mines or railway construction. In other places, like in Astrakhan, the deportees had to first obtain work permits before they could find employment. Yet in other places, such as Barnaul, the deportees were treated as prisoners and were guarded by armed soldiers. Sometimes, the Russian administration provided a few kopeks per day to the deportees but amounts and conditions on receiving these payments varied greatly. The German government organized monthly stipend for each deportee, but not everyone was able to receive it. For example, according to Jankus, after May 1915, his deportee group received no assistance from either Russians or Germans for an entire year.

In February 1915, Germany and Russia concluded an agreement for the mutual repatriation of civilian prisoners which provided that deportees, except for healthy males ages 17–45 that were fit for military duty, could return to their native country. However, many deportees lacked identity papers and the Russian authorities denied or delayed many passport applications. In March 1917, after the February Revolution, the Russian Provisional Government revoked all extrajudicial punishments thus granting amnesty and freedom of movement to all deportees. The Treaty of Brest-Litovsk, signed in March 1918, provided a free-of-charge repatriation of civil prisoners, but the process was delayed due to the Russian Revolution and the Russian Civil War. Generally, the deportees returned in 1919–1921.

Relief efforts
Activists noticed the deportees and their deplorable conditions at the train stations, primarily in Vilnius, and organized help – provided food, clothing, exchanged German marks to Russian rubles, gave them pre-addressed envelopes so that they could mail it from their destination thus providing information on their location. At the destinations, the deportees received some help from various local committees. The German government provided aid via diplomats of neutral countries, i.e. the United States embassy until the American entry into World War I and then the Swedish embassy as well as the Danish consuls. Together with POWs, the deportees received some help from the International Committee of the Red Cross and other non-government organizations such as the Committee for Military and Civilian Prisoners in Tianjin which channeled relief funds from Germany and Austria-Hungary. The Lithuanians established a relief society that specifically focused on the deportees and particularly on the Lithuanian-speaking Prussian Lithuanians.

Lithuanian Care
At first, the Lithuanians wanted to join Vilnius chapter of the All-Russian Society for the Care of Slavic Prisoners, but Polish activists voted them out arguing that Lithuanians were not Slavic. The society was chaired by Felicija Bortkevičienė and included Mykolas Sleževičius, Jonas Vileišis, and others. It was based in Vilnius but after the Great Retreat, moved to Saint Petersburg and then to Saratov where some deportees lived. The society stopped its activities when its funds were nationalized after the October Revolution.

It was impossible to obtain information on the deportees from Russian officials and the Lithuanian Care had to send its own representatives to investigate the situation, register the deportees, and organize help. It sent Steponas Kairys and Pranas Keinys to European Russia where they found 1,000 deportees in Saratov, 600 in Samara, 100 in Simbirsk, few others in Ufa, Orenburg. Bortkevičienė toured Siberia for five months searching for the deportees in Omsk, Tomsk, Irkutsk, Tobolsk, Altai Krai, Akmolinsk, Yeniseysk, and elsewhere. She found the largest group of about 1,300 deportees spread out in the Buzulk district. In total, the Lithuanian Care registered about 8,000 deportees and maintained three shelters for 55 orphans, four shelters for 150 elderly people, and six primary schools for 150 students.

References

Deportation
East Prussia
Lithuania Minor
World War I crimes by the Russian Empire
1915 in the Russian Empire
1915 in Germany